Naarda unipunctata is a species of moth in the family Noctuidae first described by George Thomas Bethune-Baker in 1911.

References

Herminiinae
Insects of West Africa
Moths of Africa
Moths described in 1911